Joseph Vankert Thomas (June 19, 1909 – August 3, 1986) was an American jazz tenor saxophonist and vocalist.

Biography
Thomas was born in Uniontown, Pennsylvania, United States, on June 19, 1909. His first band job was with the Earl Hood Orchestra. After eight months Horace Henderson offered him a job. Thomas played alto sax under Hood and Henderson, but played tenor from the time he joined Stuff Smith's band in 1932.

Thomas played with Jimmie Lunceford's band from 1933 until the leader's death in 1947, often soloing and occasionally singing. After Lunceford died, Thomas and Ed Wilcox co-led his ghost band until Thomas left to form his own septet. This band, containing trumpeter Johnny Grimes, trombonist Dicky Harris, baritone saxophonist Ben Kynard, pianist George Rhodes, bassist George Duvivier, and drummer Joe Marshall, recorded between 1949 and 1951.

Thomas then left the music industry to work for his family's undertaking business. He played occasionally, including at the 1970 Newport Jazz Festival, and recorded again under his own name in 1979. Three years later Thomas also recorded with a septet that included Grimes, Harris, and Duvivier from his band three decades earlier.

Thomas died in Kansas City, Missouri on August 3, 1986. Material from his career is held by the University of Missouri–Kansas City.

Playing style and influence
Thomas's inspirations on saxophone were Coleman Hawkins and Chu Berry. As a soloist, he did not stray far from the melody and chose to emphasise rhythm. Grove Music commented that "His huge and occasionally grainy tone influenced an entire generation of saxophonists in the 1940s".

Discography

As leader

Singles
"Don't Blame Me"/"For Boobs Only" (Melodisc, 1945)
"You're Buggin' Me (Melodisc, 1945)
"Harlem Hop" (King, 1949)
"Blue Shadows"/"Raw Meat" (King, 1950)
"Big Foot" (King, 1950)
"You're Just My Kind"/"Buttons" (King, 1951)
"Speak Your Piece"/"I Hear Music" (Symbol, 1964) with Bill Elliott

Albums
Speak Your Piece (Sue, 1964) with Bill Elliott
Joy Of Cookin' (Groove Merchant, 1972)Masada (Groove Merchant, 1975)Feelin's From Within (Groove Merchant, 1976)Raw Meat (Uptown, 1979)Blowin' in from K.C.'' (Uptown, 1982); co-led with Jay McShann

References

1909 births
1986 deaths
American jazz saxophonists
American male saxophonists
Musicians from Pittsburgh
20th-century American saxophonists
Jazz musicians from Pennsylvania
20th-century American male musicians
American male jazz musicians
Onward Brass Band members
Uptown Records (jazz) artists